The European Sambo Championships is the main sambo championships in Europe, organized by European Sambo Federation. The first championship was held in 1972 in Riga. Ukraine plans to boycott the 2022 European Sambo Championships because Russian and Belarusian athletes will be allowed to compete with neutral status. Unlike most international federations, the International Sambo Federation (FIAS) has not banned Russian and Belarusians in response to the 2022 Russian invasion of Ukraine.

Editions (Seniors)

Juniors
Competitions and events of the 2022 year

Youth
Since 2005 the European Sambo Championships among adults and the Youth and Junior European Sambo Championships have been traditionally organised.

 2005
 2006
 2007
 2008
 2009
 April 15—19, 2010 	European Championship among youth and juniors 	Greece, Thessaloniki
 April 14—18, 2011 	European Championship among youth and juniors 	Czech Republic, Prague
 April 05—09, 2012 	Youth and Juniors European championships 	Romania, Bucharest
 April 11—15, 2013 	Youth (M&W) and Juniors (M&W) European championships 	Cyprus, Limassol
 April 10—14, 2014 	Youth (M&W) and Juniors (M&W) European championships 	Spain, Caceres
 April 16—20, 2015 	Youth (M&W) and Juniors (M&W) European championships 	Serbia, Novi Sad
 April 07—11, 2016 	European championships among Youth (M&W) and Juniors (M&W) 	France, Toulouse
 April 18—22, 2017 	European Sambo Championship among Youth and Juniors 	Czech Republic, Prague
 April 12—16, 2018 	European Sambo Championship among Youth and Juniors 	Czech Republic, Prague 
 April 11—15, 2019 	European Sambo Championship among Youth and Juniors 	Cyprus, Limassol
 May 24—30, 2021 	European Sambo Championship among Adults, Youth and Juniors 	Cyprus, Limassol

Cadets
In 2012 the European SAMBO championship among cadets (15-16 years, boys and girls) was organised for the first time in Tallinn.

 September 21—24, 2012 	European Championship among cadets (15-16 years old) 	Estonia, Tallinn
 September 13—16, 2013 	European Championship among cadets (M&W 15-16 years old) 	Latvia, Riga

 December 04—07, 2015 	European Championship among Cadets (M&W 15-16 years old) 	Turkey, Istambul 
 2016
 December 01—04, 2017 	European Sambo Championship among Cadets 	Croatia, Poric 
 2018
 December 06—09, 2019 	European Sambo Championship among Cadets 	Latvia, Riga 
 December 17—20, 2021 	European Championship among Cadetes (Juniors (M&F) 14-16) 	Cyprus, Limassol 
 December 02—05 2022	European Championship among Cadetes (Juniors (M&F) 14-16) 	Moldova, Kishinev

Results 
 Чемпионат Мира | ВнутриСамбо
 About | International SAMBO Federation (FIAS)
 Sambo History - International Sambo Federation (FIAS)
 Sambo History
 FIAS - History of Sambo Videos
 FIAS - President
 FIAS - Competition Results
 FIAS - Documents
 Calendar | International SAMBO Federation (FIAS)
 Соревнования | ВнутриСамбо
 Юниоры | ВнутриСамбо
 Федерация Самбо Украины
 Федерация Самбо Украины - ІІІ чемпионат мира (1979)
 Федерация Самбо Украины - XX чемпионат мира (1996)
 Федерация Самбо Украины - VIII чемпионат мира (1984)
 Федерация Самбо Украины
 
 CISM signs MoU with International Sambo Federation
 Southeast Asian SAMBO Championships Were Held In Indonesia | International SAMBO Federation (FIAS)
 Competitions and events of the 2022 year
 XXXVIII World Sports Sambo (M&W) and Combat Sambo Championships
 Европейская федерация самбо
 European sambo federation
 Wayback Machine
 Wayback Machine
 HISTORY OF SAMBO
 Federations | International SAMBO Federation (FIAS)
 Logo unveiled for 2019 World Sambo Championships

See also 
 World Sambo Championships

References

 
Sambo (martial art) competitions
European championships
Recurring sporting events established in 1972
1972 establishments in Europe